Ortu Gable Hall School (formerly Gable Hall School) is an oversubscribed coeducational secondary school academy and sixth form located in Corringham (near Stanford-Le-Hope) in Thurrock, Essex, England. Previously a foundation school administered by Thurrock Council, the school academized on 1 July 2011 and became a multi-academy trust in 2013. In 2017 the school was rebranded as Ortu Gable Hall, ortu being Latin for "rising", alongside the trust's rebrand under the same moniker. The trust is now called the Ortu Federation and the school is sponsored by it.

Ortu Gable Hall School offers GCSEs and BTECs as programmes of study for pupils, while students in the sixth form have the option to study from a range of A Levels and further BTECs. Since 2002 the school has been a specialist arts college (performing arts) and was previously an applied learning college from 2007.

Controversies 
In April 2013, Peter Goldsmith, a former teacher at Gable Hall and Westcliff High School for Boys, admitted to downloading child abuse images. He pled guilty to three charges in exchange for avoiding jail time. Principal Sophina Asong made a statement in response in which it was reassured that the school knew there were "no direct links to any of our students" and that it had been "working closely with the Local Authority Safeguarding Officer for Thurrock to ensure that provision is available to support our students and parents should any specific safeguarding concerns regarding this individual emerge at this point."

In September 2021 a social media post about a teacher at the school allegedly calling Year 11 students "retards", "cowards" and "chicken sh**s" in an assembly went viral. Principal Ceril Evans stated that "It has come to my attention that a member of my teaching staff has made derogatory comments to the cohort of Year 11 students. As a school, we do not tolerate or accept such behaviour." The teacher was then suspended, pending an investigation. In response, some parents and ex-pupils came to the teacher's defence and campaigned for his reinstatement. The students who reported him were called "snowflakes" and "push buttons" and the teacher's suspension was lifted later that week.

Ortu Sixth Form Centre Stanford & Corringham 
The Ortu Sixth Form Centre Stanford & Corringham is an extension of Ortu Gable Hall School and it provides further education for 16-19 year olds. In Gable Hall's 2018 Ofsted inspection the sixth form was rated as Good. Students are able to apply for A-Levels, T-Levels and BTECs in a variety of subjects each categorised under five different "blocks". A-Level applications require no less than three courses and these courses must not be from the same blocks. From 2022 the sixth form will offer a level 3 BTEC in E-Sports.

The sixth form motto is "Working Together To Ensure Success" and it boasts a robust 100% student pass rate for over four years running. 98% of students so far have held two grades in A-Levels and 86% achieved three or more A*-E passes. Furthermore, fifteen subject areas boast a full-blown 100% pass rate. The current sixth form director is Ms. Sue Weston.

Notable former pupils
Renei Batlokwa, footballer
Danny Crates, former athlete
Perri Kiely, Member of dance group Diversity
Joss Labadie, footballer
Jack Plom, cricketer
Dougie Poynter, Member of pop-rock band McFly
Michael Stanley, rugby player
Matt Garvey, rugby player
Emily Scott, rugby player
Ruti Olajugbagbe, singer and The Voice UK series 7 winner

Headteachers 

 Les Jones (1980–1993/1994)
John King OBE (1993/1994–2011)
 Sophina Asong (2011–2017) 
 Clive Stokes (2017-2018)
 Ceri Evans (2018–2022)

References

External links
Ortu Gable Hall School official website

Academies in Thurrock
Secondary schools in Thurrock
Specialist arts colleges in England